Tenesha Palmer (born 16 September 1994) is a Trinidad and Tobago footballer who plays as a goalkeeper for Police FC and the Trinidad and Tobago women's national team.

International career
Palmer capped for Trinidad and Tobago at senior level during the 2014 CONCACAF Women's Championship, the 2014 Central American and Caribbean Games and the 2020 CONCACAF Women's Olympic Qualifying Championship qualification.

References

1994 births
Living people
Women's association football goalkeepers
Trinidad and Tobago women's footballers
Trinidad and Tobago women's international footballers
Competitors at the 2014 Central American and Caribbean Games